The 65th Massachusetts General Court, consisting of the Massachusetts Senate and the Massachusetts House of Representatives, met in 1844 during the governorship of George N. Briggs. Josiah Quincy Jr. served as president of the Senate. Thomas H. Kinnicutt and Samuel H. Walley, Jr. served as speakers of the House.

Senators

Representatives

See also
 28th United States Congress
 List of Massachusetts General Courts

References

External links
 
 

Political history of Massachusetts
Massachusetts legislative sessions
massachusetts
1844 in Massachusetts